Sui Baoku (born 25 April 1986) is a Chinese short track speed skater. He competed in the men's 5000 metre relay event at the 2006 Winter Olympics.

References

External links
Sui Baoku at ISU

1986 births
Living people
Chinese male short track speed skaters
Olympic short track speed skaters of China
Short track speed skaters at the 2006 Winter Olympics
Sportspeople from Heilongjiang
Asian Games medalists in short track speed skating
Short track speed skaters at the 2007 Asian Winter Games
Medalists at the 2007 Asian Winter Games
Asian Games gold medalists for China
Asian Games silver medalists for China
Asian Games bronze medalists for China
21st-century Chinese people